Eibhear Quilligan (born 1994) is an Irish hurler who plays for Clare Championship club Feakle and at inter-county level with the Clare senior hurling team. He typically starts as the goalkeeper.

Career

A member of the Feakle club, Quilligan first came to hurling prominence with St. Flannan's College in the Harty Cup. He later lined out with the Limerick Institute of Technology in the Fitzgibbon Cup. Quilligan first appeared on the inter-county scene as a member of the Clare minor team that won the 2011 Munster Championship. He subsequently lined out with the Clare under-21 team and was sub-goalkeeper when the team won the All-Ireland Under-21 Championship in 2014. Quilligan made his debut with the Clare senior hurling team during the 2020 league.

Career statistics

Honours

Clare 
All-Ireland Under-21 Hurling Championship: 2014
Munster Under-21 Hurling Championship: 2014
Munster Minor Hurling Championship: 2011

References

1994 births
Living people
Feakle hurlers
Clare inter-county hurlers
Hurling goalkeepers